Børsa Church is a parish church of the Church of Norway in Skaun municipality in Trøndelag county, Norway. It is located in the village of Børsa. It is the church for the Børsa parish which is part of the Orkdal prosti (deanery) in the Diocese of Nidaros. The white, wooden church was built in a long church style in 1857 using plans drawn up by the architect Christian Heinrich Grosch. The church seats about 380 people.

History
The earliest existing historical records of the church date back to the year 1589, but the church was not new that year. The medieval church owned some silver from England that was dated from around the year 1230 which means the church may have been established some time in the 13th century. Because of its location historically, this church was formerly known as Viggen Church.

In 1668, the old medieval stave church was torn down and replaced with a log building in a fairly rare Y-shaped floor plan. In 1853, it was decided to move the church site to the more populous village of Børsa, so planning began for a new church. After the new church was completed in 1857, the old Y-shaped church was torn down. The new church was consecrated on 26 November 1857.

Media gallery

See also
List of churches in Nidaros

References

Skaun
Churches in Trøndelag
Long churches in Norway
Wooden churches in Norway
19th-century Church of Norway church buildings
Churches completed in 1857
13th-century establishments in Norway